Harvey Goldstein (30 October 1939 – 9 April 2020) was a British statistician known for his contributions to multilevel modelling methodology, statistical software, social statistics, and for applying this to educational assessment and league tables.

Goldstein was born in Whitechapel, London to a Jewish family. He was professor of social statistics in the Centre for Multilevel Modelling at the University of Bristol. From 1977 to 2005, he was professor of statistical methods at the Institute of Education of the University of London. He was author of a monograph on multilevel statistical models.

He came from a left-wing family, and as a teenager he briefly joined the Young Communist League. He was elected a fellow of the British Academy in 1996 and awarded the Guy Medal in silver by the Royal Statistical Society in 1998.

He died on 9 April 2020. It was reported  that his death was due to COVID-19.

See also
MLwiN (software)

References

External links

 Prof Harvey Goldstein, FBA at Debrett's People of Today 
 
 Full text of 2nd edition (1995) at author's website

1939 births
2020 deaths
British Jews
British statisticians
Academics of the University of Bristol
Academics of the UCL Institute of Education
Fellows of the British Academy
Deaths from the COVID-19 pandemic in the United Kingdom